The Electoral division of Longford was an electoral division in the Tasmanian Legislative Council of Australia. It existed from 1851 until its abolition in a redistribution in 1885.

Members

See also
Tasmanian Legislative Council electoral divisions

References

Past election results for Longford

Former electoral districts of Tasmania
1851 establishments in Australia
1903 disestablishments in Australia